Till dig is Swedish singer Sonja Aldén's debut studio album. It was released on 25 April 2007. Aldén wrote or co-wrote all the songs, except for "Det är inte regn som faller". She wrote "Hjälte utan mod", "Om du vill", "Vila tryggt", "Till en ängel" and "Du är allt" on her own.

Track listing
Här står jag (Here I stand)
För att du finns (Because you exist)
Två dagar på en öde strand (Two days on a deserted beach)
Egen tid (One's time)
Hjälte utan mod (Heroes without courage)
Där kärleken bor (There love lives)
Om du vill (If you want)
Det är inte regn som faller (It is not the rain which falls)
Skratt genom tårar (Tears through joy)
Vila tryggt (Secured rest)
Till en ängel (To an angel)
Du är allt (You are everything) (duet with Shirley Clamp)
För att du finns (Because you exist) (Acoustic version)

Charts

References

2007 debut albums
Sonja Aldén albums
Swedish-language albums